The 2021 British Academy Television Awards were held on 6 June 2021, to recognise the excellence in British television of 2020. The nominees were announced along with the nominees for the 2021 British Academy Television Craft Awards on 28 April 2021, while the shortlist for the Virgin Media Must-See-Moment were announced the day before, on 27 April 2021. The ceremony was hosted for the second year in a row by Richard Ayoade.

The only television programme to win multiple awards at the ceremony was I May Destroy You, with star and creator Michaela Coel collecting both Best Miniseries and Best Actress.

Rule and award changes
In October 2020, the British Academy of Film and Television Arts (BAFTA) announced several changes in its rules and categories, both to achieve a wider variety of nominees and in response to the ongoing COVID-19 pandemic and its impact on the television industry:
 For the individual performance categories, the number of nominees increased from four to six.
 A new category, Best Daytime, was introduced, to recognise "the important role that daytime programming plays in the lives of viewers and in providing a pipeline for new and underrepresented talent".
 Due to the COVID-19 pandemic, the eligibility period for the Best Soap and Continuing Drama category was extended to the end of January 2021.
 A new requirement meant that at least half of the nominees in each category had to be members of a minority group (LGBT, non-white, disabled etc.).
 Transgender and non-binary individuals were allowed to choose which gender category to be considered for.

BAFTA suspended its Fellowship and Special Awards while reviewing its selection processes, after facing criticism for honouring Noel Clarke in April 2021 despite being aware of misconduct allegations against him.

Winners and nominees
Sources:

Ceremony
The ceremony had a traditional red carpet, and nominees could attend via video or in-person. They sat in the venue in socially-distanced groups by television programme. Some award presenters, like Bob Mortimer and Catherine Zeta-Jones, also presented virtually. Tom Allen and AJ Odudu hosted red carpet coverage.

To open the ceremony, Olly Alexander performed "Starstruck"; the performance was outside the venue. Alexander also presented an award with It's a Sin co-star Lydia West. During the ceremony, Alexis Ffrench performed a piano version of "Bluebird" for the In Memoriam.

The public vote for the "Must-See Moment" awarded dance troupe Diversity performing a routine based on the Black Lives Matter movement; the performance was conversely also the most complained-about television moment of the year. Lead dancer Ashley Banjo said that the award win "is what change looks like", as many of the complaints had been racially-charged. In accepting her award for Best Actress for I May Destroy You, Michaela Coel, who had created the show based on things that had happened to her, spoke about the importance of intimacy coordinators.

In entertainment programming, the spoken word show Life & Rhymes was considered a surprise win, competing in a category against programmes the BBC described as "heavyweights", as was entertainment performance winner Romesh Ranganathan.

In Memoriam
Source:

Ann Lynn
Larry King
Tony Morris
Frank Windsor
Ronald Pickup
Sabine Schmitz
Des O'Connor CBE
Charlotte Cornwell
Ronald Forfar
Eileen Pollock
Alan Igbon
Peter Alliss
Murray Walker OBE
Nikki Grahame
Tony Armatrading
Alan Curtis
Mark Eden
Archie Lyndhurst
Johnny Briggs MBE
Geoffrey Palmer OBE
Nicola Pagett
Margaret Nolan
Bobby Ball
Charles Beeson
Colin Leventhal
Mahmood Jamal
Frank Bough
John Sessions
Paul Ritter
Rosalind Knight
Trevor Peacock
Dame Diana Rigg DBE
Helen McCrory OBE

Viewers commented on the lack of presence of Dame Barbara Windsor's name; BAFTA responded that she had been included in the In Memoriam of the Film Awards ceremony in April.

See also
2021 British Academy Television Craft Awards
2021 in television
74th British Academy Film Awards
Impact of the COVID-19 pandemic on television

Notes

References

External links
Official website

2021
2021 in British television
2021 television awards
2021 awards in the United Kingdom
June 2021 events in the United Kingdom